Daphne & Celeste Save the World is the second studio album by American pop duo Daphne and Celeste. The album was released on March 30, 2018, almost 18 years after their debut LP We Didn't Say That!.

Production and release
The album was written and produced by English musician and producer Ben Jacobs, who records and produces under the moniker of Max Tundra. The group originally made their return in 2015, releasing the single "You and I Alone" in March of that year. After almost three years of inactivity, the group announced the album was complete in early 2018 and released a second single, "BB," in February.

Tracklist
All songs written by Max Tundra, except track 13 written by Don Van Vliet and Herb Bermann

Personnel
Celeste Cruz - vocals
Karen DiConcetto - vocals
Ben Jacobs - keyboards, synthesizer, programming, guitar, vocals on "B.B.", production

References

2018 albums
Daphne and Celeste albums
Electropop albums
Electronica albums by American artists